The women's 400 metres hurdles event at the 1995 Summer Universiade was held on 30–31 August at the Hakatanomori Athletic Stadium in Fukuoka, Japan.

Medalists

Results

Heats
Qualification: First 3 of each heat (Q) and the next 4 fastest (q) qualified for the semifinals.

Semifinals
Qualification: First 4 of each semifinal qualified directly (Q) for the final.

Final

References

Athletics at the 1995 Summer Universiade
1995 in women's athletics
1995